A locksmith is one who practices locksmithing, making and defeating locks.

Locksmith may also refer to:

 Locksmith (rapper), an American rapper
 "Locksmith" (song), a song by Tee Grizzley on the album Scriptures
 Locksmith (computing), a reboot manager for Container Linux
 Locksmith (comics), a Marvel Comics character
 Locksmith Animation, a British animation studio
 The Locksmith (TV series), a six-part British drama
 The Locksmith (film), an American film

See also 
 The Lucksmiths, an Australian indi pop band